Joyce Jillson (December 26, 1945 – October 1, 2004) was an American syndicated newspaper columnist, best-selling author, actress, and astrologer, whose column was syndicated worldwide in more than 200 papers and magazines.

Biography
Born Joyce Linda Twitchell in Cranston, Rhode Island, she attended Boston University on an opera scholarship. She began her acting career in New York City and appeared on Broadway in the Anthony Newley musical, The Roar of the Greasepaint – The Smell of the Crowd. She starred as Jill Smith in ABC-TV's Peyton Place. She played the lead role in the 1973 cult action spoof Superchick. She appeared in the 1973 Columbo episode "Any Old Port in a Storm", and had roles in the 1976 exploitation film Slumber Party '57 and the 1977 TV movie Murder in Peyton Place.

She began presenting horoscope reports on Los Angeles in 1973, and was the official astrologer for Twentieth Century Fox Studios, suggesting astrologically favorable dates for film openings, including Star Wars on May 25, 1977. She was the official astrologer for the Los Angeles Dodgers as well as a media consultant to the Ford Motor Company on the launch of the Ford Taurus. 

She was also an author, writing Real Women Don't Pump Gas, The Fine Art of Flirting, A Year of Good Luck, and Joyce Jillson's Lifesigns. Her final manuscripts, Astrology for Dogs and Astrology for Cats were published posthumously.

Personal life
Jillson was married to Joseph Gallagher from 1969 until their divorce in 1981; they had no children. Jillson died of kidney failure at Cedars-Sinai Medical Center at age 58. She had been suffering from diabetes.

Filmography
Superchick (1973) – Tara B. True
Slumber Party '57 (1976) – Car Hop - Gladys
Murder in Peyton Place (1977) – Jill Harrington

See also
 Joan Quigley
 Carroll Righter
 Jeane Dixon

References

1945 births
2004 deaths
20th-century astrologers
21st-century astrologers
Actresses from Rhode Island
American astrologers
American columnists
American musical theatre actresses
American television actresses
Boston University College of Fine Arts alumni
Deaths from diabetes
Deaths from kidney failure
People from Cranston, Rhode Island
20th-century American singers
20th-century American women singers
20th-century American actresses
American women columnists
21st-century American women